The 1984 Swiss Indoors was a men's tennis tournament played on indoor hard courts at the St. Jakobshalle in Basel, Switzerland that was part of the 1984 Volvo Grand Prix. It was the 15th edition of the tournament and was held from 8 October through 14 October 1984. Third-seeded Joakim Nyström won the singles title.

Finals

Singles
 Joakim Nyström defeated  Tim Wilkison 6–3, 3–6, 6–4, 6–2
 It was Nyström's 3rd singles title of the year and the 4th of his career.

Doubles
 Pavel Složil /  Tomáš Šmíd defeated  Stefan Edberg /  Tim Wilkison 7–6, 6–2

References

External links
 Official website 
 ITF tournament edition details

Swiss Indoors
Swiss Indoors
1984 in Swiss tennis